The Last Belle is a 2011 20-minute animated short directed by Neil Boyle. It features the voices of Sienna Guillory, Amanda Donohoe, and Colin McFarlane.

Summary
The story is all about how Rosie found love in London. After exchanging e-mails with a mysterious beau in an online chatroom for weeks, she is excited to hear that he wants to meet her in person one evening. She has been told by him that he lives in a big house, is interested in the arts and fashion, and has had his friends tell him that he bears a strong resemblance to actor Brad Pitt.

The truth is that Wally—her online lover—is a drunkard and overweight, watches adult movies and has pin-ups plastered all over his apartment, and dresses in loud shirts and ties. He too is looking forward to his date with Rosie, but while waiting to leave, he has one too many cans of beer, resulting in him falling asleep past the time he had intended to leave by. It becomes a race against the clock as Wally is literally thrown out of his apartment and has to endure the London Underground system and other obstacles in order to reach his date, while Rosie worries over whether her date will arrive at all.

Cast
Amanda Donohoe as Shavon, Rosie's friend. She is not seen, but is stated that she is married and has a child.
Sienna Guillory as Rosie, the main character.
Colin McFarlane as a bartender that Rosie ends up falling for.
Wally has no speaking lines aside from a few grunts and gasping.

Production
The film took 15 years to make, was shot on 35mm film, and was the final cel animated movie to be ever screened. Notably, Roy Naisbitt, who worked on The Thief and the Cobbler, worked on the underground sequence for this movie.

Release
The film was released in the UK in October 2011. In the USA it was released at the Brooklyn International Film Festival on 1 June 2012.

Soundtrack
The original music score was composed by British composer Stuart Hancock, and the soundtrack EP derived from it was released by MovieScore Media in 2014.

References

External links
 Official Website
 

2011 films
British animated short films
2010s English-language films
2010s British films